The 2015 WNBA season, was the 19th season for the New York Liberty of the Women's National Basketball Association. Bill Laimbeer returned as head coach.

Transactions

WNBA Draft
The following are the Liberty's selections in the 2015 WNBA Draft.

Trades

Roster

Season standings

Schedule

Preseason

|- style="background:#fcc;"
| 1
| May 22
| Chicago
| 
| Kiah Stokes (11)
| Kiah Stokes (11)
| Brittany Boyd (2)
| Bob Carpenter Center3,105
| 0–1
|- style="background:#fcc;"
| 2
| May 27
| Atlanta
| 
| Tina Charles (12)
| Kiah Stokes (11)
| Tanisha Wright (5)
| Madison Square Garden(14,530)
| 0–2
|- style="background:#fcc;"
| 3
| June 1
| @ Minnesota
| 
| Tina Charles (19)
| Tina Charles (5)
| Essence Carson (5)
| Target Center3,520
| 0–3

Regular season

|- style="background:#bfb;"
| 1
| June 5
| Atlanta
| 
| Tina Charles (17)
| Tina Charles (12)
| Tanisha Wright (5)
| Madison Square Garden8,910
| 1–0
|- style="background:#fcc;"
| 2
| June 6
| @ Washington
| 
| Tina Charles (18)
| Kiah Stokes (9)
| Swin Cash (4)
| Verizon Center7,400
| 1–1
|- style="background:#bfb;"
| 3
| June 9
| Indiana
| 
| Tina Charles (21)
| Kiah Stokes (6)
| Tanisha Wright (5)
| Madison Square Garden5,663
| 2–1
|- style="background:#bfb;"
| 4
| June 11
| Phoenix
| 
| Tina Charles (19)
| Tina Charles (11)
| Essence Carson (3)
| Madison Square Garden5,817
| 3–1
|- style="background:#fcc;"
| 5
| June 14
| Washington
| 
| Essence Carson (12)
| Sugar Rodgers (7)
| Sugar Rodgers (5)
| Madison Square Garden7,629
| 3–2
|- style="background:#fcc;"
| 6
| June 19
| Indiana
| 
| Tanisha Wright (12)
| Tina Charles (8)
| Tina Charles (5)
| Madison Square Garden7,815
| 3–3

Playoffs

|- style="background:#fcc;"
| 1
| September 18
| Washington
| 
| Epiphanny Prince (26)
| Carolyn SwordsKiah Stokes (9)
| Tina Charles (5)
| Madison Square Garden10,120
| 0–1
|- style="background:#cfc;"
| 2
| September 20
| Washington
| 
| Tina Charles (22)
| Kiah Stokes (7)
| Tanisha Wright (6)
| Verizon Center6,619
| 1–1
|- style="background:#cfc;"
| 3
| September 22
| Washington
| 
| Tina Charles (22)
| Kiah Stokes (13)
| Tanisha Wright (5)
| Madison Square Garden9,255
| 2–1
|-
|}

|- style="background:#cfc;"
| 1
| September 23
| Indiana
| 
| Kiah Stokes (21)
| Tina Charles (7)
| Tina Charles (9)
| Madison Square Garden7,229
| 1–0
|- style="background:#fcc;"
| 2
| September 27
| Indiana
| 
| Tina Charles (25)
| Kiah Stokes (11)
| Tanisha Wright (5)
| Bankers Life Fieldhouse7,505
| 1–1
|- style="background:#fcc;"
| 3
| September 29
| Indiana
| 
| Candice Wiggins (15)
| Tina Charles (10)
| Epiphanny Prince (4)
| Madison Square Garden10,120
| 1–2

Statistics

Regular season

Awards and honors

References

External links
THE OFFICIAL SITE OF THE NEW YORK LIBERTY

New York Liberty seasons
New York
New York Liberty